Christopher Wahlberg (born 10 December 1985) is a Swedish singer and songwriter.

In SödraSidan

He is known as a member of the hip hop duo SödraSidan. The band was established as Dalenbarn in 2009 as a duo of two childhood friends Daniel Jutterström (Jutte) and Christopher Wahlberg (Chrippa) both originating from Enskededalenas in southern Stockholm who had been rapping together since the age of 15. Their EP Stället där vi bor was described as "förortsrap" (meaning suburban rap). In 2010, they changed the name to SödraSidan based on their single of the same name released on December 22, 2010 together with a music video in collaboration with producer Proclaimer.

Melodifestivalen
Wahlberg participated in Melodifestivalen 2021 under the stage name WAHL along with SAMI (actually Sami Rekik of the Swedish duo Medina) with the song "90-talet". Performing during the second semi-final held on 13 February 2021, they came in 6th of 7 acts and failing to qualify to the final or the Second Chance. However their song has charted in Sverigetopplistan, the official Swedish Singles Chart.

Discography

Albums
as part of SödraSida 
2014: För evigt unga

EPs
as Dalenbarn
2009: Stället där vi bor

Singles
as part of Dalenbarn
2009: "Betongen"
2009: "Pass på dom" (feat. P) 
2009: "Stället där vi bor"
2009: "Om idag"
2009: "Jagar det"
2010: "Spår från uppväxten" (with Victoria Limenza & Don Paco)
2010: "Svarta nätter" (with Danjah)

as part of SödraSida 
2010: "SödraSidan" (feat. Danjah)
2011: "SödraSidan (Remix)" (feat. Sebbe Kartellen, Alpis, Mohammed Ali, Näääk & Fille)
2011: "Min hemstad (with Alpis)
2012: "Alla"
2012: "Fånga dagen"
2013: "Vårt sätt"
2013: "Äntligen solsken" (feat. Kaliffa)
2013: "Vi flyger" (feat. Örnsberg)
2014: "Står tillsammans"
2014: "Våran kväll" (feat. Olle Grafström)
2015: "Helt ärligt" (feat. Alpis)
2015: "Till slut" (feat. Sam-E)
2016: "Landat"
2016: "Vi fakkar upp vår värld"
2017: "Allt e precis som det ska va"
2017: "Staden i natten" (feat. Simon Erics och Simmewox)
2017: "Blinka lilla stjärna"
2018: "Rakt ut (feat. Nimo & Alpis)
2018: "Blåljus och page"

as WAHL

References

External links
SödraSidan YouTube official page

1985 births
Living people
Singers from Stockholm
Swedish male singers
Melodifestivalen contestants of 2021